Thierry Collet is a Mauritian football player who currently plays for Pointe-aux-Sables Mates in the Mauritian Premier League and for the Mauritius national football team as a midfielder. He is featured on the Mauritian national team in the official 2010 FIFA World Cup video game.

References 

Living people
Mauritius international footballers
Mauritian footballers
Mauritian Premier League players
AS Port-Louis 2000 players
Association football midfielders
1977 births